Germán Álvarez Beigbeder (15 December 1882 - 11 October 1968) was a Spanish composer.

1882 births
1968 deaths
Spanish composers
Spanish male composers
20th-century Spanish male musicians